No Justice is an Australian rock band who were signed to Molly Meldrum's label Melodian. Their single "Lately" made the Australian singles chart.

The three piece No Justice were fronted by Chook who was a reporter on Countdown Revolution. Their debut single lately" reached the top 100 on the Australian singles chart. That was followed up with a second single "More Than a Girlfriend" and the band added three members for a tour of Australia's East Coast.

Discography

Singles

References

Australian musical groups
RCA Records artists